Chariomerus (fl. 1st century) is the last recorded chieftain of the Germanic Cherusci tribe.

Life
Chariomerus appears only in the Roman History of Cassius Dio. Chariomerus succeeded Italicus as chieftain of the Cherusci sometime in the mid-1st century and was presumably his son, the rest of the dynasty having died out by the time of Italicus's ascension in AD47. This would make him the grandnephew of Arminius, the Cherusci leader who defeated the Roman army in Teutonburg Forest in AD9 butlike Italicus and Italicus's father FlavusChariomerus seems to have been a close ally of Rome. Defeated by the Chatti sometime around AD88, Chariomerus was deposed by his own people for his Roman ties. He turned to the emperor Domitian for assistance recovering his rule. Domitian offered financial support but not soldiers. By the end of the 1st century, the Cherusci people had disappeared from treatments of Germany.

References
 .

1st-century monarchs in Europe
Cherusci rulers
Cherusci warriors